Gaetano Lanzi (5 February 1905 in Rome – 1980) was an Italian boxer who competed in the 1924 Summer Olympics. In 1924 he was eliminated in the second round of the flyweight class after losing his fight to the upcoming gold medalist Fidel LaBarba.

References

External links

Report on Italian Olympic boxers 

1905 births
1980 deaths
Boxers from Rome
Flyweight boxers
Olympic boxers of Italy
Boxers at the 1924 Summer Olympics
Italian male boxers
20th-century Italian people